Seventhian... Memories of Time is the seventh studio album by Finnish power metal band Dreamtale, released globally on the Secret Door Records label on 9 December 2016. It was released earlier in Japan, on 23 November 2016. It comes as a two-piece CD set; the first disc, "Seventhian", contains new songs, and the second disc, "Memories of Time", contains new re-recorded versions of the band's older tracks, with the disc title being a reference to one of their tracks from the band's first album Beyond Reality.

Track listing

Disc 1: Seventhian 
 "Dreality" – 3:28
 "For Our Future" – 4:05
 "October Is Mine" – 4:07
 "Picnic Inferno" – 4:18
 "Cabal Toyboy" – 4:41
 "True Life" – 4:19
 "Reality Reborn" – 4:29
 "Fusion Illusion" – 4:44
 "Names on the Wall" – 4:30
 "Greenback Hunter" – 3:44
 "Moral Messiah" – 4:14
 "Embrace My Scars" – 5:12

Disc 2: Memories of Time 
 "Refuge From Reality" – 4:51
 "Call of the Wild" – 4:51
 "Angel's Eyes" – 4:17
 "Two Hundred Men" – 3:55
 "My Only Wish" – 4:53
 "World's Child" – 4:52
 "Take What the Heavens Create" – 2:52
 "Firebird" – 3:52
Total runtime: 86:14

Personnel 
 Rami Keränen – guitar and backing vocals
 Erkki Seppänen – vocals
 Janne Juutinen – drums
 Seppo Kolehmainen – guitar
 Akseli Kaasalainen – keyboards
 Heikki Ahonen – bass

External links 
 Review of the album

Dreamtale albums
2016 albums